Rasmus Carl Stæger (3 November 1800 – 9 February 1875) was a Danish attorney, civil servant, politician and entomologist.

Biography
Stæger was born and died in Copenhagen, Denmark. He took his legal degree in 1817. Over the course of his career, he  served as a judge, elected official and financial advisor to the Danish government in the Bureau of Foreign Payments, National Debt Office and Council of Justice. From 1858 to 1871 he was a member of Frederiksberg Parish Council, from 1859 to 1862 he was deputy chairman and then until 1871 mayor of Frederiksberg.

As an entomologist, his  foci were Dolichopodidae, Sepsidae and Chironomidae. Stæger’s Diptera collection is in the 
Natural History Museum of Denmark in Copenhagen.

Works
Systematisk Fortegnelse over de i Danmark hidtil fundne Diptera (1840)
Danske Dolichopoder (1842–43)
Systematisk Fremstilling af den danske Favnas Arter af Antliatslægten Sepsis (1844)
Grønlands Antliater beskrevne (1845)

Some Diptera described by Stæger
Sepsis ciliata Sepsidae
Oxycera falleni Stratiomyidae
Syrphus hyperboreus Syrphidae
Siphona strigata Tachinidae 
Dolichopus angustifrons Dolichopodidae
Sybistroma crinipes Dolichopodidae

References

External links
Diptera collection Natural History Museum of Denmark 

1800 births
1875 deaths
People from Copenhagen
Danish entomologists
Dipterists
Danish jurists
19th-century Danish politicians